The Vezouze is a river in north-eastern France, right tributary to the river Meurthe. Its source is on Mont Donon in the Vosges département.

The river joins the Meurthe on the northern edge of Lunéville, France, the former capital of Lorraine that was strategically located there. In the 18th century the dukes of Lorraine channelled the flow of the water into a series of garden follies at the Château de Lunéville.

Towns along the river 
 Val-et-Châtillon 
 Cirey-sur-Vezouze
 Blâmont
 Domèvre-sur-Vezouze
 Bénaménil
 Thiébauménil
 Marainviller
 Croismare
 Chanteheux
 Lunéville

References

Rivers of France
Rivers of Meurthe-et-Moselle
Rivers of Vosges (department)
Rivers of Grand Est